In medicine, intravascular volume status refers to the volume of blood in a patient's circulatory system, and is essentially the blood plasma component of the overall volume status of the body, which otherwise includes both intracellular fluid and extracellular fluid. Still, the intravascular component is usually of primary interest, and volume status is sometimes used synonymously with intravascular volume status.

It is related to the patient's state of hydration, but is not identical to it. For instance, intravascular volume depletion can exist in an adequately hydrated person if there is loss of water into interstitial tissue (e.g. due to hyponatremia or liver failure).

Clinical assessment

Intravascular Volume Depletion

Volume contraction of intravascular fluid (blood plasma) is termed hypovolemia, and its signs include, in order of severity:
 a fast pulse
 infrequent and low volume urination
 dry mucous membranes (e.g. a dry tongue)
 poor capillary refill (e.g. when the patient's fingertip is pressed, the skin turns white, but upon release, the skin does not return to pink as fast as it should - usually >2 seconds)
 decreased skin turgor (e.g. the skin remains "tented" when it is pinched)
 a weak pulse
 orthostatic hypotension (dizziness upon standing up from a seated or reclining position, due to a drop in cerebral blood pressure)
 orthostatic increase in pulse rate
 cool extremities (e.g. cool fingers)

Intravascular volume overload

Signs of intravascular volume overload (high blood volume) include:
 an elevated Jugular venous pressure (JVP)

Intravascular Blood Volume Correlation to a Patient's Ideal Height and Weight
For the clinical assessment of intravascular blood volume, the BVA-100, a semi-automated blood volume analyzer device that has FDA approval, determines the status of a patient’s blood volume based on the Ideal Height and Weight Method.
Using a patient’s ideal weight and actual weight, the percent deviation from the desirable weight is found using the following equation:

Using the deviation from desirable weight, the BV ratio (ml/kg), i.e. Ideal Blood Volume, can be determined.
The machine was tested in clinical studies for the treatment of a broad range of medical conditions related to Intravascular Volume Status, such as anemia, congestive heart failure, sepsis, CFS, Hyponatremia, Syncope and more. This tool for measuring blood volume may foster improved patient care as both a stand-alone and complementary diagnostic tool as there has been a statistically significant increase in patient survival.

Pathophysiology

Intravascular volume depletion

The most common cause of hypovolemia is diarrhea or vomiting. The other causes are usually divided into renal and extrarenal causes. Renal causes include overuse of diuretics, or trauma or disease of the kidney.  Extrarenal causes include bleeding, burns, and any causes of edema (e.g. congestive heart failure, liver failure).

Intravascular volume depletion is divided into three types based on the blood sodium level:
 Isonatremic (normal blood sodium levels) Example: a child with diarrhea, because both water and sodium are lost in diarrhea.
 Hyponatremic (abnormally low blood sodium levels). Example: a child with diarrhea who has been given tap water to replete diarrheal losses. Overall there is more water than sodium in the body. The intravascular volume is low because the water will move through a process called osmosis out of the vasculature into the cells (intracellularly). The danger is tissue swelling (edema) the most important being brain edema which in turn will cause more vomiting.
 Hypernatremic (abnormally high blood sodium levels). Example: a child with diarrhea who has been given salty soup to drink, or insufficiently diluted infant formula. Overall there is more sodium than water. The water will move out of the cell toward the intravascular compartment down the osmotic gradient. This can cause tissue breakage (in case of muscle breakage it is called rhabdomyolysis).

Intravascular volume overload

Intravascular volume overload can occur during surgery, if water rather than isotonic saline is used to wash the incision. It can also occur if there is inadequate urination, e.g. with certain kidney diseases.

See also
 Body water
 Oral rehydration therapy

References

Blood tests